Natasha Mitchell is an Australian science journalist. She currently presents the Radio National program "Life Matters", a program that was first broadcast in 1992 and initially presented by Australian journalist Geraldine Doogue.

Mitchell is currently the vice-president of the World Federation of Science Journalists, a position she has held since 2011. She was elected to the Federation's executive board in 2009.

Mitchell was a Knight Science Journalism Fellow in 2005/2006.

References

Living people
Date of birth missing (living people)
Science journalists
Australian women journalists
Australian radio journalists
ABC radio (Australia) journalists and presenters
Women radio journalists
Year of birth missing (living people)